The Journal of Carnojevic is a lyrical novel by Miloš Crnjanski, which was first published in 1920. The narrator of the novel is Petar Rajic, who tells his story in which there is no clearly established narrative flow, nor are events connected by cause and effect.

References

External links
  Journal of Carnojevic (fragments) by Milos Crnjanski, translated by Lazar Pascanovic

Serbian novels
Serbian poetry
1920 novels